The Strelets Arab or Strelets Horse is an extinct Ukrainian breed of light cavalry horse. It was bred in the nineteenth century at the Striletsky State Stud in Luhansk Oblast of Ukraine, from Arab and a variety of other stock. As with other Russian horse populations, its numbers were gravely reduced by the events of the Russian Revolution and the Russian Civil War, and it came close to disappearing. Two stallions and a few mares survived, which was judged to be too small a number to allow the breed to be recovered. Instead, they were taken to the Tersk Stud in the North Caucasus and used as the foundation stock in the development of the new Tersk breed of riding horse. The Strelets also contributed to the development of the Don and Kustanai breeds.

History 

It derived from a complex series of cross-breedings, initially of Arab and Anglo-Arab or Thoroughbred stock, later with some input from Karabakh, Orlov-Rostopchin, Persian and Turkmene horses. The predominant influence was that of the Arab, and the result was a horse of Arab appearance, but somewhat larger and faster. Among the Arab stallions used in the creation of the breed were Obayan Serebryany, a grey foaled in 1851; Tsiprian, foaled in 1875; and Tsenny, foaled in 1899, who was the sire of both Tsenitel and Tsilindr, the last two stallions of the breed survive.

Characteristics

Notes

References 

Horse breeds
Horse breeds originating in Ukraine